Olís is the trade name of Iceland Oil Ltd., a company founded in Iceland on October 3, 1927. The company has ever since been a part of the development of the Icelandic industries. The company is now divided into three main operating divisions: Sales, Logistics and Finance, along with support divisions which are Human Resources and Marketing. The firm operates a number of service stations under the trademark of Olís, in addition to the self-serve stations under the brand name of ÓB - inexpensive fuel. The first operational ÓB station was at Fjardarkaup in Hafnarfjördur. ÓB provides cheaper fuel and less service in simply operated automated stations.

In 1999, Iceland Oil Ltd. purchased all shares in Ellingsen, which was then consolidated into the holding company in 2001. The company also owns all shares in subsidiaries companies Hátækni and ísmar.

Olís is one of the 30 largest companies in Iceland turnover being ISK 37 billion in 2012. The Balance Sheet amount to ISK 16.0 billion. The number of employees in 2012 was approximately 420.

External links 
About OLÍS

Oil companies of Iceland
Energy infrastructure in Iceland
Filling stations
Petroleum in Iceland